Rhizobotrya is a genus of flowering plants belonging to the family Brassicaceae.

Its native range is Italy.

Species:
 Rhizobotrya alpina Tausch

References

Brassicaceae
Brassicaceae genera